State Route 516 (SR 516) is a  state highway in the U.S. state of Washington, serving communities in southern King County. The highway travels east as the Kent-Des Moines Road and the Kent-Kangley Road from a concurrency with SR 509 in Des Moines through Kent and Covington to an intersection with SR 169 in Maple Valley. SR 516, designated as part of the National Highway System within Kent, intersects three major freeways in the area: Interstate 5 (I-5) in western Kent, SR 167 in downtown Kent, and SR 18 in Covington. The roadway, built in the 1890s, was codified in 1937 as Secondary State Highway 1K (SSH 1K) from Des Moines to Kent and SSH 5A from Kent to Maple Valley. The two highways were combined during the 1964 highway renumbering to form SR 516 on its current route.

Route description

SR 516 begins in Des Moines at Marine View Drive as SR 509 turns north towards Burien near the East Passage of Puget Sound. The two concurrent highways travel east on the Kent-Des Moines Road past Highline Community College and Mount Rainier High School to an intersection with SR 99 in western Kent, where SR 509 turns south towards Tacoma. SR 516 then intersects I-5 at a partial cloverleaf interchange and continues east onto a four-lane divided highway over the Green River and its pedestrian and bicycle trail into downtown Kent. The highway serves as the southern terminus of SR 181 before intersecting SR 167 in a diamond interchange at the western edge of downtown Kent. SR 516 shifts south onto Willis Street and crosses the Interurban Trail and a BNSF rail line before turning north onto Central Avenue and east onto Smith Street near Kent Station. The highway travels southeast along Mill Creek onto the Kent-Kangley Road and serves as the southern terminus of SR 515 at Kent-Meridian High School before leaving Kent for Covington. SR 516 passes Lake Meridian as 272nd Street and intersects SR 18 at a diamond interchange located in Covington. The highway continues east past Pipe Lake and into Maple Valley before crossing the Cedar to Green River Trail and ending at an intersection with SR 169.

Every year, the Washington State Department of Transportation (WSDOT) conducts a series of surveys on its highways in the state to measure traffic volume. This is expressed in terms of annual average daily traffic (AADT), which is a measure of traffic volume for any average day of the year. In 2011, WSDOT calculated that the busiest section of the highway was between SR 181 and the SR 167 interchange, serving 38,000 vehicles, while the least busiest section was its western terminus at SR 509, serving 8,900 vehicles. SR 516 between I-5 and SR 167 within western Kent is designated as part of the National Highway System, which includes roadways important to the national economy, defense, and mobility.

History

The Kent-Kangley Road was built as a wagon road by King County by the late 1890s and was upgraded to a paved highway after being codified as two highways during the creation of the primary and secondary state highways system in 1937: SSH 1K and SSH 5A. The two highways were combined during the 1964 highway renumbering to form SR 516 and codified into law in 1970. The highway traveled east from SR 509 in Des Moines through I-5 at Midway, SR 167 in Kent, and SR 18 in Covington to SR 169 in Maple Valley. SR 509 was re-aligned in 1991 onto SR 516 and SR 99, forming new concurrencies, until the completion of a new north–south freeway.

Major intersections

References

External links

Highways of Washington State

516
Transportation in King County, Washington